The 1963 Temple Owls football team was an American football team that represented Temple University as a member of the Middle Atlantic Conference (MAC) during the 1963 NCAA College Division football season. In its fourth season under head coach George Makris, the team compiled a 5–3–1 record (1–2 against MAC opponents) and finished fourth out of six teams in the MAC's University Division. 

Temple's season-ending November 23 matchup with Gettysburg was canceled following the assassination of John F. Kennedy the previous day.

The team played its home games at Temple Stadium in Philadelphia.

Schedule

References

Temple
Temple Owls football seasons
Temple Owls football